The Khajuraho Dance Festival (IAST:Khajuraho Nritya Samaroh), organised by the Madhya Pradesh Kala Parishad, is a one-week festival of classical dances held annually beside the Khajuraho temples in Chhatarpur district of Madhya Pradesh state in central India. The festival is conducted in February from the 20th to the 26th.

This festival highlights the richness of the Indian classical dance styles such as Kathak, Bharathanatyam, Odissi, Kuchipudi, Manipuri, Gaudiya Nritya, and Kathakali with performances of some of the best exponents in the field. Modern Indian dance has been added recently.

The dances are performed in an open-air auditorium, usually in front of the Chitragupta Temple dedicated to Surya (the Sun God) and the Vishvanatha Temple dedicated to Lord Shiva, belonging to the western group.

See also
 Modhera Dance Festival

References 

Indian classical music
Dance festivals in India
Festivals in Madhya Pradesh
Tourist attractions in Madhya Pradesh
Khajuraho
February events
Annual events in India
Festivals established in 1975
1975 establishments in Madhya Pradesh